The Protestant Federation of France (Fédération protestante de France) is a religious organisation created on 25 October 1905, which united the main Protestant Christian groupings in France. The current president is Christian Krieger, who took over from previous president François Clavairoly in 2022.

Federation
The Protestant Federation of France may be further divided as follows: 
Lutheran
Reformed
Evangelical
Pentecostal

Exhaustive list (2019) of Churches or unions of Churches which are members of the PFF:
 United Protestant Church of France (EPUF), 2013 union of the Reformed Church of France (ERF) and the Evangelical Lutheran Church in France (EELF)
 Union of Protestant Churches of Alsace and Lorraine (UEPAL), 2006 union of the  Protestant Church of Augsburg Confession of Alsace and Lorraine (EPCAAL) and the Protestant Reformed Church of Alsace and Lorraine (EPRAL)
 National Union of Independent Reformed Evangelical Churches of France (UNEPREF, formerly EREI)
  (FEEBF)
  de France (MPEF)
  (UEEL)
 Salvation Army (AdS, Armée du Salut)
 Malagasy Protestant Church in France (FPMA)
 Communauté des Églises d'expressions africaines en France (CEAF)
 Union of the Church of God in France (UEDF)
  (METF)
 Union des Églises évangéliques de Réveil (UEER)
 Church of the Nazarene (UEPN)
  (CEEF)
 Communion d'Églises protestantes évangéliques (CÉPÉE)
 International Church of the Foursquare Gospel (UEPFF, 
  (UAPM)
 Seventh-day Adventist Church (UFA, 
 Église de Pentecôte de France (EPF)
 Église Hillsong de Paris
 Fédération des Églises coréennes en France (FECF)
 Union d'Assemblées de Dieu membre de la FPF (ADFP)
 Armenian Evangelical Church (UEEAF)
 Union de l’Église évangélique méthodiste de France (UEEMF)
 Union des Églises protestantes évangéliques Horizon (UEPEH)

 Associated members
 Agapé - France
 Communauté d'Églises protestantes francophones (Ceeefe) 
 German Protestant Church in Paris
 Japanese Protestant Church
 Église protestante évangélique de Rochefort
 American Church in Paris
 

 Former members
 Apostolic Church (EA)

In all, the federation unites 23 churches or unions of churches, as well as 81 associations which represent about 500 communities, institutions and movements.

The member churches of the PFF comprise some 1,268 parishes, 1,065 pastors (of which 196 are women). 900,000 Protestants belong to the member Churches.

The churches cooperate in variety of sectors: childcare, care of the elderly, social and medical action, holidays and outings in the community, education, communication, art, international relations, development.

Presidents 
 Édouard Gruner (1905-1927)
 Rev. Émile Morel (1927-1929)
 Rev. Marc Boegner (1929-1961)
 Rev. Charles Westphal (1961-1970)
 Jean Courvoisier (1970-1977)
 Rev. Jacques Maury (1977-1987)
 Rev. Jacques Stewart (1987-1997)
 Rev. Jean Tartier (1997-1999)
 Rev. Jean-Arnold de Clermont (1999-2007)
 Rev. Claude Baty (2007-2013)
 Rev. François Clavairoly (September 2013 - June 2022)
 Rev. Christian Krieger (July 2022 - present)

See also

 Lyon Anglican Church

External links
 Official site
 The Maison du protestantisme is at coordinates 

History of Protestantism in France
Christian organizations established in 1905
Protestant denominations established in the 20th century
1905 establishments in France